The 1976 Giro di Lombardia was the 70th edition of the Giro di Lombardia cycle race and was held on 9 October 1976. The race started in Milan and finished in Como. The race was won by Roger De Vlaeminck of the Brooklyn team.

General classification

References

1976
Giro di Lombardia
Giro di Lombardia